Teodora Poštič (born 25 September 1984) is a Slovenian former figure skater. She is a four-time (2006–09) Slovenian national champion and reached the free skate at four ISU Championships – three Europeans and one Junior Worlds. By placing fifth at the 2009 Nebelhorn Trophy, she qualified a spot for Slovenia in the ladies' figure skating event at the 2010 Winter Olympics in Vancouver. She placed 27th at the Olympics.

Programs

Competitive highlights 
JGP: Junior Grand Prix

References

External links

 

Slovenian female single skaters
Living people
1984 births
Figure skaters at the 2010 Winter Olympics
Olympic figure skaters of Slovenia
Sportspeople from Jesenice, Jesenice
Competitors at the 2009 Winter Universiade
21st-century Slovenian women